Vattica, (stylized VATTICA) is an American alternative rock band from Los Angeles, California formed in 2013. Singer, songwriter, multi-instrumentalist, and producer Alexander Millar is the only permanent member of the band. The band has performed at venues such as The Viper Room, The Roxy Theater and The Troubadour. They were signed to a recording contract in 2015 by Another Century / Sony Music.

History
VATTICA formed in 2013 in Los Angeles, California as a collaboration between Alexander Millar, Prentice and Joey Jane. The name VATTICA is a fusion of Old English and Latin root words and syllables: Vat (faet), meaning vessel, and Vatic/Vatical (of or characteristic of a prophet or oracle), and Ah (exclamation expressing surprise/irony). By 2014 the group had performed at various notable venues and clubs around Los Angeles, including The Roxy Theater, Whisky a Go Go, The Viper Room and The Troubadour.

Early Years (2014-2017)
In August 2014, VATTICA entered the studio to record a self-produced demo album in Los Angeles. In January 2015, the band announced their signing to Another Century Records.

Debut album recording (2017)
In 2016 VATTICA entered the studio to begin recording their debut album at The Mix Room in Burbank, California, with record producer Ben Grosse. In 2017 VATTICA finished their debut album. At the same time, Another Century was absorbed by RED Music. Alexander elaborated on the separation further in an interview with Pure Grain Media. In an interview with Bi Pride UK in 2020 Alexander spoke further about getting out of the band's recording contract. VATTICA then joined forces with new management and released their first single, “REMEMBER TO BREATHE”, on their own label VILLIS with distribution through The Orchard in April 2018.

Independent success: 2018-Present 
VATTICA released their second single and music video, "Criminal", in October 2018. In 2019 VATTICA announced that the band would be appearing on the High School Nation tour.

2020: EP release 
In 2020 VATTICA released their debut EP entitled "Believe". That same month the COVID-19 pandemic hit the United States and all of their shows were canceled and the newly added members of the group went their separate ways. During this time Alexander kept writing music and VATTICA released their single "Make It (I Know)".

2021: Single & Music Video Releases 
VATTICA released two singles in 2021; "Broken Glass" and "Gasoline". The official music video for "Gasoline" was released exclusively on TikTok.

2022: TikTok influence 
Alexander does a regular series on VATTICA's TikTok called "Self Made is a Toxic Myth" where they critique the idea that there is such a thing as a self made artist. The series has garnered millions of views.

Musical style

VATTICA’s music is alternative pop rock characterized by soaring vocal melodies, driving guitars, vast orchestration and commanding rhythm sections of wide dynamic variety. Their lyrical content often reflects on the universal themes of the human experience, while also commenting on sociopolitical issues.

Public image and activism 
Alexander has publicly stated that they are non-binary and queer. They are also a part of Good Trouble Makers, a queer BIPOC-led anti-racist collective.

Members
Current
 Alexander Millar – songwriting, lead vocals, guitar, piano, keyboard, programming

Former
 Prentice – drums, percussion, backing vocals
 Joey Jane – bass, backing vocals

References

External links
 Official site
 Official Another Century Artist Page

2013 establishments in California
20th-century American guitarists
20th-century American keyboardists
20th-century American pianists
20th-century American singers
21st-century American guitarists
21st-century American keyboardists
21st-century American pianists
21st-century American singers
Alternative rock groups from California
Alternative rock guitarists
Alternative rock singers
Alternative rock pianists
American alternative rock musicians
American art rock groups
American rock keyboardists
American rock guitarists
American rock pianists
American rock songwriters
Another Century Records artists
Queer singers
Queer songwriters
Non-binary singers
Non-binary songwriters
Feminist musicians
LGBT people from California
LGBT producers
American LGBT songwriters
American LGBT singers
Lead guitarists
Living people
Musical groups established in 2013
Musical groups from Los Angeles
Musicians from the San Francisco Bay Area
Singer-songwriters from California
Year of birth missing (living people)
American non-binary writers